The mixed 4 × 400 metres relay event at the 2022 African Championships in Athletics was held on 9 June in Port Louis, Mauritius. It was the first time that a mixed event was contested at the African Championships.

Results

References

2022 African Championships in Athletics
Relays at the African Championships in Athletics